Tony Ahn (born June 7, 1978) is a South Korean singer, best known as a member of boy band H.O.T.

After H.O.T. disbanded in 2001, its ex-members Tony Ahn, Jang Woo-hyuk and Lee Jae-won formed the dance music trio jtL. Eventually, JTL unofficially disbanded as each member, including Tony, released their solo material.

Biography 
He is the CEO of TN Nation Entertainment, a music entertainment company; Skoolooks, a school uniform company; and Shinenihs, an undergarment company. Popular comedians Jung Hyung-don and Jo Hye-ryun were both part of TN Nation Entertainment.

In 1997, Tony was admitted to Dongguk University. He majored in stage performance and graduated in 2003.

Career

Solo 
Tony changed his genre to fast-paced soft rock songs and gave a speech, telling about his views on his former H.O.T. members, and how he tried to contact them. He also released a music video title "Melody" featuring SAT from his special album, "Untold Story".

On April 28, 2008, Tony came back with a new special album entitled "Look Blank", with its principal song "Wallet".
In September 2010, Tony completed his 2-year army duty and released a new song, "Going To Meet You Now". He released an EP titled 'Top Star' in February 2011, and after leaving as MC for the popular No. 1 Kpop chart show Mcountdown! in 2012 he released a single called "Beautiful girl" which also features Hyun Jun of SMASH.

jtL 

When JTL was created, Tony was the lead vocal for the group and not just a back-up vocal and English rapper. H.O.T. fans had mixed feelings for jtL. Many of jtL's music videos were boycotted. However, things changed around when jtL held a 'Guerilla Concert' in front of 12,133 fans.

TN Nation Entertainment 
After Tony wanted to pursue a solo career during his jtL days, he created his own label, TN Nation Entertainment. Artists under this label are Tony and former Click-B member Yoo Ho-suk, going under the name "Evan", along with Jung Ju-ri, Shin Bong-sun, 어썸베이비 (Awe5omeBaby), and others. South Korean comedian and entertainer Jung Hyung-don was the member of this company.

TN Nation Entertainment also debuted a boy band named SMASH, who released a music video for their debut song, "비상[Emergency]", on August 14, 2008. Tony collaborated with SMASH in February 2012 with 'Get Your Swag On'. They promoted the song together on various live music shows. SMASH later disbanded at the end of 2014.

On June 19, 2015, the company debuted their first girl group, a five-member beatpella (beatbox + a cappella) group called 어썸베이비 (literally Awesome Baby, stylized as Awe5omeBaby). The members include June, Sumin, Yechan, Dahee, and Lina. Their debut single was '내가 왜?' or 'Why Should I?'.

Personal life 
In November 2013, Tony was investigated for illegal online sports gambling alongside South Korean comedian Lee Soo Geun and South Korean entertainer Tak Jae-hoon. Reportedly, he gambled a total of 400,000,000 KRW (approximately $376,000 USD) between May 2009 and March 2012. He had his first hearing on December 6 and received a six-month prison sentence with one year probation on December 27.

On February 13, 2014, in light of Tony's illegal gambling incident, KBS revealed they had imposed a ban on all of H.O.T.'s songs and prevented his show appearances on their media outlets while MBC simultaneously announced a temporary ban on Tony's show appearances on their channels as well. As of 2016, all the major stations lifted the ban on Tony.

An is currently housemates with Sechs Kies's member Kim Jae-duck. The arrangement had caused a stir amongst their contemporaries as both groups were regarded as one another's fiercest industry rivals during the late 1990s and largely avoided any contact with one another despite crossing paths many times. They had met and befriended one another during their mandatory military service.

Filmography

Film

Television series

Variety show

Discography

Studio albums

Extended plays

References

External links 
  
  

1978 births
H.O.T. (band) members
Living people
South Korean male idols
Dongguk University alumni
South Korean male singers
South Korean pop singers
Singers from Seoul